Seoul Metropolitan City Route 41 is a trunk road located in Seoul, South Korea.

Stopovers
 Seoul
 Seocho District
 Gyeonggi Province
 Gwacheon
 Seoul
 Seocho District - Gangnam District

List of Facilities 
IS: Intersection, IC: Interchange

References

Roads in Gyeonggi
Roads in Seoul